Call-Ready is a historic microphone and sound service company based in Bangladesh. The Call-Ready service became very popular between 1950s and 1970s in East Pakistan before the Independence of Bangladesh. This mic service has been used in almost every movements during that period. The notable events where the service was used, the Bengali language movement in 1952, 1954 East Bengali legislative election, the Six point movement in 1966, 1969 Mass uprising, 1970 Pakistani general election and 7 March Speech of Bangabandhu.

References

1948 establishments in East Pakistan
Companies of Bangladesh